Basse-sur-le-Rupt is a commune in the Vosges department in Grand Est in northeastern France. Its inhabitants are called Bassurois. It is a mountainous commune of seven hamlets, crossed by the river Rupt. Its landmarks include Le Haut du Roc, Le Pierre des Communes, Le Piquante Pierre and the memorial of Le Croix des Moinats. Its historical industries were textiles, sawmills and granite.

Geography 
Situated in fairly mountainous country, the Basse-sur-le-Rupt is laid out over approximately 10 kilometres along the  départementale 34 which links Vagney with La Bresse, rising from 409 to 1060m in altitude. The commune's seven hamlets are
 La Burotte
 Contrexard
 Planois
 Presles
 Pubas
 Trougemont
 L'Echté

History 
Basse-sur-le-Rupt was notable during the Second World War. Piquante Pierre, one of the highest summits in the commune, through its height and its surrounding forests provided shelter to a Maquis.
This unit was destroyed on 21 September 1944 by the German army. Piquante Pierre became thereafter a memorial to the dead, commemorating the 83 maquisards who were lost.

Demography

Administration 

The mayor is Nadine Perrin, re-elected in 2020.

Monuments and notable landmarks 

Le Haut du Roc is a high point shared with the commune of Saulxures-sur-Moselotte. It is located at 1014 metres altitude, on poudingues ("puddings", mixtures of sandstone and pebbles). On a platform which offers a wide panorama of the commune, a cross was set up in 1933.

La Pierre des Quatre Communes is a boundary stone originally found by a trail walker in the forest. It marks the communes' border with three of its neighbours, La Bresse, Cornimont and Rochesson. It is also the highest point in the commune at 1060 metres.

La Piquante Pierre is a monolith situated at 1008 metres altitude of unknown origin. It is remarkable because if one looks closely at it, it is notable that it has four faces (like the statues on Easter Island. Each face points in a cardinal direction. During the Second World War it was home to a maquis group of resistance fighters.

La Croix des Moinats is a monument to commemorate the Moroccan Goumiers who fought in the region during the Second World War. Their battalions, known as tabors, comprised 12000 soldiers, paid a heavy price of 9000 killed or wounded.

Personalities 
 Isidore Étienne, 4 February 1872 - 2 January 1960, a local businessman, was president of the union of French granite-workers.

Heraldry

See also 
Communes of the Vosges department

References

External links 

  Homepage of the mairie
  Tourist office
  The architectural and design heritage of the commune on the official site of the French ministry of culture (Bases Mérimée, Palissy, Palissy, Mémoire, ArchiDoc), Médiathèque de l'architecture et du patrimoine (archives photographiques) diffusion RMN, et service régional de l'inventaire général de la Région Lorraine
Basse-sur-le-Rupt on Ifrance.com

Communes of Vosges (department)